Hydryphantidae is a family of mites in the order Trombidiformes. There are more than 30 genera and 130 described species in Hydryphantidae.

Genera
These 36 genera belong to the family Hydryphantidae:

 Almuerzothyas Goldschmidt & Gerecke, 2003
 Amerothyasella Smith & Cook, 1999
 Ankelothyas Besch, 1964
 Chimerathyas Mitchell, 2003
 Cowichania Smith, 1983
 Cyclohydryphantes Lundblad, 1941
 Cyclothyas Lundblad, 1941
 Dacothyas Motas, 1959
 Eupatrella Walter, 1935
 Euwandesia André & Naudo, 1962
 Georgella Koenike, 1907
 Hydryphantes C. L. Koch, 1841
 Ignacarus Gerecke, 1999
 Iranothyas Bader, 1984
 Japonothyas Imamura & Mitchell, 1967
 Javathyas Viets, 1929
 Kazakhithyas Smit, 2016
 Mamersa Koenike, 1898
 Neocalonyx Walter, 1919
 Notopanisus Besch, 1964
 Panisellus Viets, 1925
 Panisopsis Viets, 1926
 Panisus Koenike, 1896
 Parathyas Lundblad, 1926
 Parathyasella Viets, 1949
 Partnunia Piersig, 1896
 Placothyas Lundblad, 1926
 Protziella Lundblad, 1934
 Pseudothyas Thor, 1899
 Setodiscophrya Jankowski, 1981
 Sindacoides Bader, 1992
 Tadjikothyas Sokolow, 1948
 Tartarothyas Viets, 1934
 Thyasella Viets, 1926
 Trihothyas Lundblad, 1934
 Vietsia Lundblad, 1926

References

Further reading

External links

 

Trombidiformes
Acari families